American punk rock band Rise Against has recorded 142 songs, which include 129 original songs and 13 covers. Rise Against was formed in 1999, and signed a recording contract with the independent record label Fat Wreck Chords the following year. Under this label, they released The Unraveling (2001) and Revolutions per Minute (2003), which helped to establish an early fanbase. Afterwards, the band signed with Geffen Records, and made its major record label debut with Siren Song of the Counter Culture (2004), followed by The Sufferer & the Witness (2006). Both albums charted on the Billboard 200, with the latter peaking at number ten. Rise Against's popularity continued to grow when they switched labels once again to DGC and Interscope Records, and the next three albums—Appeal to Reason (2008), Endgame (2011), and The Black Market (2014)—charted highly worldwide. Rise Against's eighth album, Wolves, was released in 2017.

Rise Against's music was initially characterized by its gritty combination of hardcore punk and melodic hardcore. With the release of Appeal to Reason, the band's music shifted toward a more accessible and radio-friendly sound, with greater emphasis on production value. The band members are well known for their outspoken social commentary, which often permeates their lyrics. Songs like "Hero of War" and "Survivor Guilt" question the brutality of modern warfare, while "Prayer of the Refugee" is about forced displacement. Not all Rise Against songs discuss controversial topics, such as "Savior", which is about forgiveness and broken relationships.

Tim McIlrath is Rise Against's primary lyricist, while the band members collectively write the music for their songs. Six out of the band's nine albums have been recorded at The Blasting Room in Fort Collins, Colorado, with producers Bill Stevenson and Jason Livermore. Of the band's 142 songs, nineteen have been released as singles, while three have been promotional singles. Rise Against's best charting singles are "Help Is on the Way", which reached number eighty-nine on the Billboard Hot 100; and "Savior", which held the record for the most consecutive weeks spent on both the Hot Rock Songs and Alternative Songs charts, with sixty-three and sixty-five weeks respectively. Two singles from Siren Song of the Counter Culture, "Give It All" and "Swing Life Away", helped Rise Against achieve mainstream appeal.

Songs

Notes

References

External links
Rise Against songs at Allmusic
Rise Against at Discogs

Rise Against